A Crown colony or royal colony was a colony administered by the Crown within the British Empire. There was usually a Governor, appointed by the British monarch on the advice of the UK Government, with or without the assistance of a local Council. In some cases, this Council was split into two: an Executive Council and a Legislative Council, and was similar to the Privy Council that advises the Monarch. Members of Executive Councils were appointed by the Governors, and British citizens resident in Crown colonies either had no representation in local government, or limited representation. In several Crown colonies, this limited representation grew over time. As the House of Commons of the British Parliament has never included seats for any of the colonies, there was no direct representation in the sovereign government for British subjects or citizens residing in Crown colonies. 

The administration of Crown colonies changed over time and in the 1800s some became, with a loosening of the power of royal governors, self-governing colonies, within which the Sovereign state (the UK Government) delegated legislation for most local internal matters of governance to elected assemblies, with consent of the governor. The elected assemblies had their beginnings in the House of Burgesses of the Colony of Virginia in 1619 and the House of Assembly of the Parliament of Bermuda in 1620. Over the centuries in some Crown colonies, more independent authority was given. 

All British colonies, whether Crown (such as Hong Kong and the Falkland Islands) or self-governing (such as Bermuda), were renamed "British Dependent Territories" from 1 January 1983 under the British Nationality Act 1981. Many British citizens in the colonies (with the exceptions of the Falkland Islanders and subsequently the Gibraltarians) found that their "Citizenship of the United Kingdom and Colonies"  From 2002, the colonies have been known officially as British Overseas Territories.

History
Early English colonies were usually established and administered by companies under charters granted by the monarch. The first "royal colony" was the Colony of Virginia, after 1624, when the Crown of the Kingdom of England revoked the royal charter it had granted to the Virginia Company and assumed control of the administration.

Executive governors are sometimes complemented by a locally appointed and/or elected legislature with limited powers — that is, such territories lack responsible government. For example, while the House of Assembly of Bermuda has existed continuously since its first session in 1620, Bermuda has only had responsible government since 1968. (Bermuda became a Crown colony in 1684, when the government revoked a royal charter given to the Somers Isles Company, successor to the Virginia Company, which had previously controlled administration, including the appointment of governors. Afterwards the British government appointed the Governor of Bermuda.)

Despite its later usage, the term "Crown colony" was used primarily, until the mid-19th century, to refer to colonies that had been acquired through wars, such as Trinidad and Tobago. After that time it was more broadly applied to every British territory other than British India, and self-governing colonies, such as the Province of Canada, Newfoundland, British Columbia, New South Wales, Queensland, South Australia, Tasmania, Victoria, Western Australia, and New Zealand.

By the mid-19th century, the monarch was appointing colonial governors only on the advice of the Secretary of State for the Colonies.

Reclassification (1981)

The term Crown colony continued to be used until 1981, when the British Nationality Act 1981 reclassified the remaining British colonies as "British Dependent Territories". By this time, the term "Crown colony" referred specifically to colonies lacking substantial autonomy, which were administered by an executive governor, appointed by the British Government — such as Hong Kong, before its transfer in 1997 to the People's Republic of China.

Types
There were three types of Crown colony as of 1918, with differing degrees of autonomy:

Crown colonies with representative councils, such as Bermuda, Jamaica, Ceylon and Fiji, contained two legislative chambers, consisting of Crown-appointed and locally elected members.

Crown colonies with nominated councils, such as British Honduras, Sierra Leone, British Windward Islands and Hong Kong, were staffed entirely by Crown-appointed members, with some appointed representation from the local population. Hong Kong had a representative council following the introduction of election for the Hong Kong Legislative Council in 1995.

Crown colonies ruled directly by a governor, such as Basutoland, Gibraltar, Saint Helena and Singapore, were fewest in number and had the least autonomy.

List

See also
British Empire
British overseas territories
British protectorate
Colonial Office
Crown dependency
Direct rule over Northern Ireland
Legislative council
Proprietary colony
Self-governing colony

Notes

References

Governance of the British Empire
1981 disestablishments in the British Empire
History of colonialism